Michael John Richardson (born 4 October 1986) is a South African-born German cricketer.  Richardson is a right-handed batsman who fields as a wicket-keeper.  He was born in Port Elizabeth. Richardson made his debut for Durham in a first-class match against Durham MCCU in 2010.

Richardson's family has a strong cricketing background.  His father, Dave Richardson, played Test cricket for South Africa.  His grandfather, John Richardson, uncle Ralph Richardson, and cousin Matthew Richardson have all played first-class cricket. In 2016 he wed Kate.

In June 2019, he was called up to Germany's team for the Regional Finals of the 2018–19 ICC T20 World Cup Europe Qualifier tournament in Guernsey, replacing Daniel Weston, who broke a finger. Richardson qualified to play for the team by having German citizenship on his mother's side. He made his Twenty20 International (T20I) debut for Germany, against Denmark, on 19 June 2019.

In September 2021, he was named in Germany's T20I squad for the Regional Final of the 2021 ICC Men's T20 World Cup Europe Qualifier tournament. In January 2022, he was named in Germany's team for the 2022 ICC Men's T20 World Cup Global Qualifier A tournament in Oman.

References

External links

1986 births
Living people
People from Port Elizabeth
South African emigrants to Germany
English cricketers
Durham cricketers
German cricketers
Germany Twenty20 International cricketers